Johannes Maria Staud (born 17 August 1974) is an Austrian composer.

Biography 

Staud was born in Innsbruck and studied with, among others, Brian Ferneyhough and Michael Jarrell (at the University of Music and Performing Arts Vienna). In 1999/2000 Staud was fellow of the Alban Berg Foundation. He gained a publishing contract with Universal Edition in 2000. He was co-founder of the composers group Gegenklang in Vienna. His Apeiron. Music for Large Orchestra was premiered by the Berlin Philharmonic Orchestra under Sir Simon Rattle in 2005, and his Segue. Music for Violoncello and Orchestra was performed by Heinrich Schiff and the Vienna Philharmonic Orchestra under the baton of Daniel Barenboim at the opening concert of the 2006 Salzburg Festival. In 2010/2011 he was Capell-Compositeur of the Staatskapelle Dresden. Since autumn 2018, he has been professor of composition at the Mozarteum University Salzburg.

Awards
 2001 Special music prize of the Austrian Republic
 2002 Composition award of the Salzburg Easter Festival
 2004 Ernst von Siemens Composers' Prize
 2009 Hindemith Prize
 2012

Works 
Source:

Piano 

 Hommage à Bartók I (1994)
 Hommage à Bartók II (1994)
 Bewegungen (1996)
 Go Ahead (2004)
 Peras (2005)

Solos 

 Black Moon pour clarinette basse (1998)
 Towards a Brighter Hue pour violon (2004)
 Portugal pour percussions (2006)
 Celluloid pour Basson seul ( 2011)

Chamber music 

 Dichotomie for string quartet (1997/98)
 Esquisse retouchée (Incipit 2) for trombone (with Bass-Drum) (2002)
 Configurations / Reflet for 8 players (2002)
 Sydenham Music pour flute, viola and harp (2007)
 Für Bálint András Varga 10 miniatures for violin, cello and piano (2007)
 Lagrein for violin, clarinet, cello and piano (2008)

Orchestra 

 ...gleichsam als ob... for orchestra (1999/2000)
 A map is not the territory for large ensemble (2001)
 Berenice. Suite 1 for ensemble and tape (2004)
 Berenice. Suite 2 for ensemble (2004)
 Apeiron for large orchestra (2005)
 On Comparative Meteorology for orchestra (new version) (2010)
 Contrebande (On Comparative Meteorology II) (2010)
 Tondo Preludio for orchestra (2010)
 Chant d'amour variation on miniature n. 9 from Für Bálint András Varga. 10 Miniaturen für Klaviertrio (2007–2009) for ensemble (2010)

Concertos 

 Incipit for alto trombone and 5 instruments (2000)
 Polygon for piano and orchestra (2002)
 Incipit III (Esquisse retouchée II) for trombone, string orchestra, 2 horns and percussion (2005)
 Violent Incidents (Hommage à Bruce Nauman) for saxophone, wind ensemble and percussion (2005/2006)
 One Movement and Five Miniatures for harpsichord, live-electronics and ensemble (2006/2007, new version 2009)
 Im Lichte for 2 pianos and orchestra (2007)
 Segue for cello and orchestra (new version) (2008)
 Über trügerische Stadtpläne und die Versuchungen der Winternächte (Dichotomie II) for string quartet and orchestra (2008/2009)

Vocal works 

 Die Ebene (after texts by Hans Arp) for speaker, horn, 2 trombones, 2 percussionists, piano, 2 cellos and double bass (1997)
 Vielleicht zunächst wirklich nur 6 miniatures for soprano and 6 instruments (1999)
 der kleinste abstand zwischen zwei gegenständen (after visuals texts by Heinz Gappmayr) for 16 voices a cappella (1999)
 Berenice. Lied vom Verschwinden (text by Durs Grünbein after Edgar Allan Poe) for soprano, small ensemble and tape (2003)
 Arie am Rand alter Bücher for baryton, piano, bamboo chimes and tape (2005)

Operas 
 Berenice, text by Durs Grünbein, after Edgar Allan Poe; world premiere at the Munich Biennale 2004 ; Heidelberg 2005
 Die Antilope, 2014, Luzerne
 Die Weiden, libretto by Durs Grünbein, 2018, Vienna State Opera Conductor: Ingo Metzmacher, Director: Andrea Moses

Discography 

 Johannes Maria STAUD, including A map is not the territory ; Bewegungen ; Polygon. Musik für Klavier und Orchester ; Black Moon ; Berenice. Lied vom Verschwinden, Marino Formenti (piano), Petra Hoffmann (soprano), Ernesto Molinari (bass clarinet), Thomas Larcher (piano), Klangforum Wien (Sylvain Cambreling), Vienna Radio Symphony Orchestra (Bertrand de Billy), CD KAIROS, 2003, n° 0012392KAI.
 Johannes Maria STAUD, Apeiron , including Apeiron ; Incipit III ; Towards a Brighter Hue ; Violent Incidents ; Peras. Berlin Philharmonic Orchestra (Sir Simon Rattle), WDR Symphony Orchestra (Lothar Zagrosek), Windkraft Tirol (Kasper de Roo), Marcus Weiss (saxophon), Uwe Dierksen (trombone), Marino Formenti (piano), Ernst Kovacic (violin), CD KAIROS, 2007, n° 0012672KAI.

Sources
 Johannes Maria Staud biography and works on the UE website (publisher)
Article on Staud in The Oberlin Review, 29 February 2008

Notes

Austrian male composers
Austrian composers
International Rostrum of Composers prize-winners
Living people
Ernst von Siemens Composers' Prize winners
Musicians from Innsbruck
1974 births